"Your Man" is a song recorded by American country music artist Josh Turner. It was released in July 2005 as the lead-off single and title track from his album of the same name. The fourth chart single of his career, it became his first number one hit on the US Billboard Hot Country Songs charts in early 2006. The song was certified Gold in 2006 by the RIAA, Platinum in 2012, Double Platinum in 2018 and Triple Platinum in 2021. It has sold 1,307,000 copies in the United States as of November 2015.

The song won American Society of Composers, Authors and Publishers (ASCAP) awards for writers Chris Stapleton and Chris DuBois, as well as a Broadcast Music Incorporated (BMI) award for writer Jace Everett upon its reaching number one.

Chart performance

Year-end charts

Certifications and sales

See also
 List of number-one country singles of 2006 (U.S.)

References

2005 singles
2005 songs
Josh Turner songs
MCA Nashville Records singles
Country ballads
Song recordings produced by Frank Rogers (record producer)
Songs written by Chris DuBois
Songs written by Jace Everett
Songs written by Chris Stapleton